André Isidore Carey (c. 1790, Paris – ?) was a French ballet dancer. A student of Auguste Vestris, he arrived in Stockholm in 1815 as premier danseur in the Royal Swedish Ballet until 1823. He débuted in December 1815 in La Fille mal gardée by Jean Dauberval, choreographed by Jean-Baptiste Brulo and with a company also including Sophie Daguin.

In 1820, he succeeded Filippo Taglioni as ballet master and dance director. Leaving Sweden in 1823, Carey danced in Warsaw in 1823–24, Milan and Naples in 1828–29, Moscow in 1838 and finally setting up home in Amsterdam, where he was partner to Madame Montessu. His date of retirement is unknown. For a long while he corresponded with August Bournonville who was teaching Carey's sons Gustave and Édouard.

He married the French ballerina Josephine Sainte-Claire in Stockholm in 1821

Notes

Dancers from Paris
1790 births
French male ballet dancers
Year of death missing
19th-century French ballet dancers
French ballet masters
Royal Swedish Ballet dancers